Malchi magnificus is a proetid trilobite belonging to the  family Phillipsiidae.  The exquisitely preserved fossils are found in Lower Carboniferous-aged marine strata of what is now Malchi Creek, Queensland, Australia.

References

 Proetida fact sheet 

Carboniferous trilobites
Trilobites of Australia
Philipsidae
Proetida genera